Roy's Peak is a mountain in New Zealand, standing between Wanaka and Glendhu Bay. It offers a full-day's walk with views across Lake Wanaka and up to the peak of Mount Aspiring / Tititea. The track zigzags steeply up the side of Mount Roy through thick grass until the ridge to the summit. The peak was named in honour of the Scottish hero Rob Roy MacGregor by early settlers.

See also
 List of mountains of New Zealand by height

References

Mountains of Otago
Queenstown-Lakes District
Southern Alps